Hakoinen Castle (Hakoisten linnavuori in Finnish) is the ruins of a fortification on a hill in Janakkala, Finland. Dated to the medieval period, the fortification was situated on a very steep-sided rock by Lake Kernaala (Kernaalanjärvi) in a manner reminiscent of the hill fort tradition. Today very little remains of the castle. Equally little is known about its origins. 

The name of the castle is not historical and was taken from the nearby Hakoinen mansion (Haga gård in Swedish). The original name is not known, but it may have been "Häme Castle" (Tavastehus in Swedish) which today is used for a later castle in the nearby town of Hämeenlinna. A source from 1625 calls Hakoinen as the "old Tauaste hus". "Tauestahus" Castle is first mentioned in sources in 1308.

The castle was probably built at the end of the 13th century or in the early 14th century. It has been speculated that Hakoinen might have been the fort that was attacked by invading Novgorodian forces in 1311 during the Swedish-Novgorodian Wars, as described in the Novgorod Chronicle:

"The men of Novgorod went in war over sea to the country of the Germans, against the Finnish (Yem) people -- And the Germans fell back into the citadel. For the place was very strong and firm, on a high rock, not having access from any side. And they sent with greeting, asking for peace, but the men of Novgorod did not grant peace, and they stood three days and three nights wasting the district."

Eventually Hakoinen was abandoned. Some activity seems to have continued there until the 1380s. The castle rock was later part of a large estate belonging to the bailiff of Häme Castle.

According to excavations, the castle was divided into two parts. Lower defensive constructions were mostly made of wood. Constructions on the rock were of bricks and rocks. The castle probably had one tower.

The site has only been excavated in the early 20th century.

See also
 Motte-and-bailey castle

References

Further reading
 At Home Within Stone Walls: Life in the late medieval Häme Castle. Toim. Anna-Maria Vilkuna, Johanna Onnela, Terhi Mikkola, Päivi Luuppi, Markus Hiekkanen ja Knut Drake. Archaeologia Medii Aevi Finlandiae VII. (2003)
 Hämeen Linna - The castle of Häme. Toim. Pirjo  Poutanen ja Katleena Kortesuo. (2000)
 Taavitsainen, Jussi-Pekka; Ancient hillforts of Finland: problems of analysis, chronology and interpretation with special reference to the hillfort of Kuhmoinen. (1990)
 Hämeen linna. Kirj. Sampo Ahto, Pertti Kilkki ja Rainer Knapas,Sotasokeat, (1973)
 Ailio, Julius; Hämeen linnan, esi- ja rakennushistoria (1917)
 Rinne, Juhani; Suomen keskiaikaiset mäkilinnat (1914)
 Heikel, A. O.; Muinaisjäännöksiä. Hauhon kihlakunta, Suomalaisen Tiedeseuran Bidrag-sarja 29.
 Janakkalan historia. Janakkalan kunta (1976). .

External links
3D panoramas of the castle.

Former castles in Finland
Ruins in Finland
Buildings and structures in Kanta-Häme